Torsten "Toto" Jansen (born 23 December 1976 in Adenau, Rhineland-Palatinate) is a former German handballer, who spent the majority of his career playing for HSV Hamburg in the Bundesliga. He was also a regular member of the German national team. In March 2017 he took over as head coach of the Handball Sport Verein Hamburg.

He received a silver medal at the 2004 Summer Olympics in Athens and also represented Germany at the 2008 Summer Olympics in Beijing. 
Jansen became a World champion in 2007, and European champion in 2004.

References

1976 births
Living people
People from Adenau
German male handball players
Olympic handball players of Germany
Handball players at the 2004 Summer Olympics
Handball players at the 2008 Summer Olympics
Olympic silver medalists for Germany
Sportspeople from Hamburg
Olympic medalists in handball
Medalists at the 2004 Summer Olympics
Sportspeople from Rhineland-Palatinate